Yokuşbaşı is a village in the Honaz District of Denizli Province in Turkey.

References

Villages in Honaz District